Iasyr Shivaza, sometimes spelled Yasir Shiwazi or Shivaza (5 or 18 May 1906 – 18 June 1988), known by his pseudonym Xianma, was a Soviet poet, writer, linguist, translator, and social activist of Dungan descent, known for his contributions to Dungan art and culture.

Shivaza founded Soviet Dungan literature and authored many textbooks in the Dungan language, helping improve literacy among the Dungan people, who were largely illiterate after fleeing the Qing dynasty. The first book that he wrote, "The Morning Star", was published in 1931 and is the first printed book in the history of the Dungan people. Shivaza is the author of more than thirty works of literature, including collections of poems and short stories in Russian, Kyrgyz and Dungan. He translated classics of Soviet literature from Russian to Dungan, as well as works of Kyrgyz writers and poets into Dungan. His works have also been translated into other languages spoken by the various peoples of the USSR, some of which have been published abroad.

His works inherited both Chinese and Russian cultures. Particularly, the description of Russian folklore in his poetry and the repeated presentation of Russian characters and events reflect the poet's profound Russian complex.

Well respected among Central Asians and Chinese people, Shivaza's Dungan poems became popular in the Sinosphere, the Soviet Union.

Name spelling
Prior to the switch to the Cyrillic alphabet which he and others had created, his name was spelled "Jasьr Şьvazь" in the Latin alphabet used between 1932 and 1953. Before the Soviets banned the Arabic script in the 1920s, his name was rendered in Xiao'erjing as يَاصِعَر شِوَذِ (nowadays used by some Hui). During his literary activity, he was known by his pseudonym "Xianma".

According to Rimsky-Korsakoff (1991), his family name, "Shivazi" (Шывазы), literally means "the tenth child"; the corresponding expression is written in Chinese as 十娃子. This kind of three-syllable family name is common among the Dungan people of the former Soviet Union.

There were two different spellings of his family name: "Shiwazi" and "Shivaza", the latter being used by Russophones due to naming customs imposed by the Russian Empire (later the Soviet Union). He was fully known as Ясыр Джумазович Шиваза (Yasyr Dzhumazovich Shivaza) in Russian, with the patrynomic "Джумазович" being derived from his father's Dungan name "Jiujiuzi" (Җюҗюзы, rendered in Russian as "Jumaza" or Джумаза). His Kyrgyz name  (Yasyr Jumaza uulu Shivaza, previously spelled "Jasьr Ƶumaza uulu Şivaza" in the Uniform Turkic Alphabet and written as ياسىر شىۋازا in the Perso-Arabic script) was taken from his Russian name.

Personal life
Yasir Shiwazi was born on 18 May (or 5 May according to Russian sources) 1906 in the village of Sokuluk some 30 km west of Bishkek, in what is known today as the Chuy Region of Kyrgyzstan. His parents and grandparents were born in China's Shaanxi province, and came to Kyrgyzstan (at the time, part of the Russian Empire) from the Ili region in the early 1880s, after the defeat of the Dungan Rebellion and the return of the Yining (Kulja) area to China.

In 1916, when he was 10 years old, he was sent to study at the village's Koranic school where he studied Arabic until 1923, and during this time period, he worked at a blacksmith shop. He later mentioned that it was only by luck that he did not become a mullah, like the other three students who reached the graduation.

After the October Revolution of 1917, Shivaza's father, Jumaza Shivaza (pinyin: Shiwazi Jiujiuzi) participated in establishing Soviet power in the region, joining the Communist Party of the Soviet Union in 1919, and later becoming the chairman of the village Soviet.

Later 17-year-old Yasir Shiwazi was chosen, by drawing lots (there were no volunteers), to study at the Tatar Institute for Education of the Minority Group  in Tashkent. During the six years (1924–30) that he spent there, Shiwazi, together with other Dungan students including Husein Makeyev and Yusup Yanshansin, started working on designing a suitable alphabet for Dungan based on the Soviet Latin script and began writing Dungan poetry.

Shivazi died on 18 June 1988 at age 82 in Frunze, Kirghiz SSR.

Literary career
After graduation, Shiwazi spent two months in the fall of 1930 teaching at a Dungan school in Frunze (now Bishkek), participating in the creation of the first Dungan spelling books and readers. He was then transferred to an editing job at Kirgizgosizdat (Kyrgyzstan State Publishing House), where he worked until 1938, and then again in 1954–57. He continued both to work on textbooks for his people and to write poetry. At least three of his textbooks were published in 1933, and at 1934 he was admitted to the prestigious Union of Soviet Writers. He started translating Russian classics into the Dungan language as well, his translation of several Pushkin's poems being published in Frunze in 1937.

He worked for the Union of Kyrgyz Writers in 1938–41, and then again in 1946–54. When Nazi Germany invaded the USSR, he started to do war work—in Moscow and sometimes on the front lines—primarily writing and translating materials for the Kyrgyz-language news-sheets published for the 100,000 or so Kyrgyz soldiers in the Red Army.

The post-war period was a productive one in Shiwazi's writing career. He also participated in the committees designing the new Dungan Cyrillic alphabet, which was eventually introduced in 1953. In the 1950s, he was finally able to meet Chinese writers from China whom visited the Soviet Union at the time, and he made a trip to China in 1957 with a Soviet Dungan delegation.

Huimin bao
He, along with another Dungan poet Husein Makeyev, worked on the Huimin bao, which was published in Bishkek and named after the Hui people, and is the only Dungan-language newspaper. Since the 1930s, the newspaper had been renamed several times; first published in 1930 in the Kirghiz ASSR as Sabattuu bol, then Dun Xuәşir (lit. 'Spark of the East') in 1932 before all publications were ceased in 1939. As the Soviet Dungan newspaper resumed publication in 1957, it was renamed Sulian huizu bao (lit. 'Soviet Hui Newspaper'). During this time, Shivazi was appointed its editor-in-chief, holding that post until his retirement in 1965. In 1958, he then renamed the newspaper to Shiyuedi qi (lit. 'The October Banner'), and then was finally renamed again as Huimin bao after the collapse of the Soviet Union. However, in 2014, this newspaper was renamed by the Chinese as Zhun-ya Huimin bao due to the fact that Dungan people (part of the Hui ancestry) are spread throughout Central Asia.

Original works

Shiwazi's literary production was ample and versatile. Along with politically loaded poems and stories, expected from any author who was to survive in Joseph Stalin's era, he wrote love poetry, poems out the past and present of his people and his land, about China, and children's literature. Some of his poetry addressed to China, the land of his ancestors, welcoming the Communist revolution that was happening, or had just happened there.

Soviet Dungans being largely separated from China's written culture, the language of Shiwazi's poetry and prose – and the Dungan literary language in general – is closer to the colloquial, sometimes dialectal Chinese than to traditional Chinese. He was, however, familiar with some of the modern Chinese literature, such as works of Lu Xun, but, since he never had the opportunity to learn Chinese characters, he read the translated Russian versions.

Poem sample: "White Butterfly"
Following is a short poem by Shiwazi, "White Butterfly", originally published in 1974 in Dungan, along with its KNAB 1994 romanization based on Pinyin, a morpheme-by-morpheme "transcription" into the Chinese characters, and the English translation by Rimsky-Korsakoff (1991), p. 188–189.

The poet writes of a butterfly, who is happy in the here-and-now of the spring, but who is not going to see the fall with its golden leaves. He appears to make a botanical error, however, mentioning a variety of chrysanthemum among spring flowers, even though in reality they bloom in the fall.

Translations

Having participated in the creation of the Dungan alphabet and bringing literacy to the Dungan people, Shivaza also did a large amount of work in making literary works from other languages available in Dungan. He rendered a number of classical and modern works of Russian poetry into the Dungan language. He has translated a number of works by Pushkin, Lermontov, Nekrasov, Mayakovsky. He translated song lyrics by Lebedev-Kumach and prose works by Leo Tolstoy, Chekhov, and Maxim Gorky.

He also translated into Dungan some poems of the Ukrainian classic Shevchenko, of the Kyrgyz poets Sashylganov and Tokombaev, and even of the Belarusian Yanka Kupala.

Being fluent in Kyrgyz, Shivaza also translated some of his works into Kyrgyz.

Translation sample
Following are the first two stanzas of Shivaza's translation of Pushkin's The Tale of the Priest and of His Workman Balda into Dungan along with its Pinyin-based KNAB 1994 transliteration, its morpheme-by-morpheme "transcription" into the Chinese characters, and an English translation.

Scholarly works
"Хуэймин бо" (Huimin bao, Frunze, 1957–1964; then known as "Шийүәди чи", 'The Banner of October Revolution')
"Лёнминщин" ('Morning Star', 1931)
"Гәминди лон" ('The Wave of the Revolution', 1932)
"Тёҗянхади сывын" ('Selected Poems', 1958)
"Хома, чунтян ('Hello, Spring', 1966)
"Хо пын-ю" ('Good Friends', 1958)
"Щин сывын", Frunze, 1973; "Мой новый дом" ('My New Home', Frunze, 1969)

Awards
Order of the Red Banner of Labour – 6 June 1956
Order of Peoples Friendship – 22 August 1986
Order "Badge of Honour" (x3) – until 1 November 1958
Medal For Labor Valour – 4 May 1962
Medal For Valiant Labour

Notes

References

Main source
Svetlana Rimsky-Korsakoff Dyer, "Iasyr Shivaza: The Life and Works of a Soviet Dungan Poet". Verlag Peter Lang GmbH, 1991. .  (Contains a detailed bibliography and ample samples of Shivaza works', some in the original Cyrillic Dungan, although most in a specialized transcription, with English and sometimes standard Chinese translations).

Other literature
Сушанло Мухамед, Имазов Мухаме.  "Совет хуэйзў вынщүә". Фрунзе, "Мектеп" чубаншә, 1988. (Mukhamed Sushanlo, Mukhame  Imazov. "Dungan Soviet Literature: textbook for 9th and 10th grade". Frunze, 1988). .

1906 births
1988 deaths
Kyrgyzstani writers
Kyrgyzstani poets
Kyrgyzstani people of Chinese descent
Kyrgyzstani people of Hui descent
Writers of Chinese descent
20th-century poets
20th-century Kyrgyzstani writers
Hui people
Soviet male writers
Soviet poets
Soviet translators
Soviet novelists
Soviet short story writers
20th-century translators